Adam (died after 1249) was a Hungarian Catholic prelate in the 13th century, who served as Bishop of Nyitra (today Nitra, Slovakia) at least from 1244 to 1249.

Career
Adam was elected Bishop of Nyitra sometime after the first Mongol invasion of Hungary. His predecessor James was killed in the Battle of Mohi in 1241. Adam is first mentioned as a suffragan in June 1244. Upon the instruction of King Béla IV, he registered a certain noble Ders as the new owner of the land Dubnica in Nyitra County (present-day a borough of Bojnice, Slovakia) in November 1244. Prior to that, Ders was forced to hand over his estate Parna in Pozsony County, and was granted Dubnica as a compensation. Adam instructed his cathedral chapter (a place of authentication) to determine and record the boundaries of Ders' new estate. Adam's role in the process reflects the transitional situation between the disintegration of the pristaldus (bailiff) institution and the still undeveloped practice of the homo regius (king's man) institution in the middle of the 13th century. Adam assumed a similar role in December 1244.

Adam registered Andrew Hont-Pázmány to the ownership of Mánya (Maňa) was lying under Turóc Castle (also known as Znió or Zniev, present-day near Kláštor pod Znievom, Slovakia) in April 1249. Adam is also mentioned among the witnesses by the establishing charter of Turóc Abbey in 1252. However its interpolated list of dignities reflects a situation from the year 1248, which thus does not prove that Adam held the position even in 1252. Nevertheless, the next bishop Nicholas first appears in contemporary records in 1253.

References

Sources

 
 
 

13th-century Hungarian people
13th-century Roman Catholic bishops in Hungary
Bishops of Nitra